New Walk is a high quality poetry and arts print magazine published at Leicester University, Leicester, England, but with a national and international focus. The magazine was established in 2010. It is edited by Rory Waterman and Nick Everett, with the fiction edited by Libby Peake. New Walk mainly publishes poetry, but also includes poetry book reviews, interviews with major poets, essays, fiction and artwork.

Contributors to the magazine include: Alice Oswald, J.M. Coetzee, Ian Parks, Alan Jenkins, William Logan, Alison Brackenbury, Timothy Murphy, Mark Ford, Andrew Motion, David Mason, Dawn Potter, Tom Pow, and Grevel Lindop.

References

External links
 New Walk information
 New Walk magazine website

2010 establishments in the United Kingdom
Literary magazines published in the United Kingdom
Magazines established in 2010
Mass media in Leicester
Poetry magazines published in the United Kingdom
University of Leicester
Visual arts magazines published in the United Kingdom